This is a list of women photographers who were born in Denmark or whose works are closely associated with that country.

A
Pia Arke (1958–2007), Greenlandic visual and performance artist, writer and photographer

B
 Jette Bang (1914–1964), large collection of photographs of Greenland depicting the lifestyle of the Greenlandic Inuit
Mari Bastashevski (born 1980), Russian-born Danish photographer, writer, and artist
 Sisse Brimberg (born 1948), staff photographer for National Geographic completing some 30 stories, now living in Scotland

C
 Helena Christensen (born 1968), fashion photographer contributing to Nylon, Marie Claire, and Elle
Amalie Claussen (1859–1950), artistic photographer from Skagen

E
Tina Enghoff (born 1957), photographer, video artist and writer

F
 Frederikke Federspiel (1839–1913), one of the first female photographers to practice in Denmark, an early user of dry plates and flash powder

G
 Marianne Grøndahl (1938–2012), documentary photographer working in the theatrical environment, also in advertising and portraiture

H
 Thora Hallager (1821–1884), one of Denmark's earliest female photographers, practicing daguerreotyping from around 1850 
Caroline Hammer (1832–1915), early professional photographer
Charlotte Hanmann (born 1950), photographer, painter and graphic artist
Julie Edel Hardenberg (born 1971), Greenland photographer and book illustrator
Bodil Hauschildt (1861–1951), early Danish photographer, studio in Ribe
 Johanne Hesbeck (1873–1927), portrait photographer in Holte, north of Copenhagen

K
 Sophia Kalkau (born 1960), art photography, often categorized as performative photography, often related to her work as sculptor.
 Kirsten Klein (born 1945), landscape photographer on the island of Mors with a melancholic style achieved by using older techniques
Astrid Kruse Jensen (born 1975), specialist in night photography

J
 Astrid Kruse Jensen (born 1975), specializing in night photography often with very long exposure times

L
 Julie Laurberg (1856–1925), portrait and court photographer in Copenhagen

M
 Rigmor Mydtskov (1925–2010), court photographer, also worked in the theatre environment

S
 Mary Steen (1856–1939), Denmark's first female court photographer, opened a studio in 1884, encouraged women to take up photography

T
Louise Thomsen (1823–1907), early photographer with a studio in Hellebæk

W
 Mary Willumsen (1884–1961), from 1916 produced postcards of women in scanty clothing, now considered an artistic contributor
 Benedicte Wrensted (1859–1949), opened a studio in Horsens in the 1880s before emigrating to the United States, where she photographed Native Americans

See also
List of women photographers

References 

-
Danish women photographers, List of
Photographers, List of Danish
Photographers